Recreating Eden is a Canadian lifestyle and gardening television documentary program. Its aim is to examine the physical, mental, and spiritual healing effects that gardens have on their keepers

History
Recreating Eden was originally broadcast on HGTV Canada in 2002, but after two seasons was not renewed.
It was then picked up by VisionTV for an additional three seasons. As of 2010, the series has not been renewed for a sixth season.

Community Garden Initiative
VisionTV and Recreating Eden teamed up in 2007 to create the Community Garden Initiative, a project to fund green communities in cities and towns across Canada. The program ran successfully for two years, funding six projects.

2007 recipients
 The Youth Garden in Dufferin Grove Park organized by FoodShare Toronto.
 The Garden of Lite in Winnipeg.
 The Julien Project in Guelph.

2008 recipients
 Greenest City in Toronto.
 North Central Community Garden in Regina.
 Bayview Memorial Park Stream Restoration in the township of Oro-Medonte.

References

External links
 
 

Gardening television
HGTV (Canada) original programming
Urban agriculture
2002 Canadian television series debuts
2008 Canadian television series endings
2000s Canadian documentary television series
VisionTV original programming